The Front Page is a CBS Television series, broadcast beginning September 29, 1949, and starring John Daly and Mark Roberts, with Richard Boone, Curt Conway and Janet Shaw. The live 30-minute show, based on the 1928 play The Front Page by Charles MacArthur and Ben Hecht, aired Thursdays at 8pm ET.

Premise
The series revolved around editor Walter Burns and his star reporter Hildy Johnson.

In the series premiere an assassination attempt has been made on the city's corrupt mayor. Hildy is on his honeymoon, so Burns compels him to come back and cover the story by kidnapping Hildy's mother-in-law. After a follow-up assassination plot is discovered and foiled, Burns keeps Hildy in town by getting the mayor to arrest Hildy.

Cast
 John Daly as editor Walter Burns
 Mark Roberts as reporter Hildy Johnson
 Cliff Hall as Mayor Barber
 Leona Powers as Mrs. Grant
 Janet Shaw as Peggy Grant

Production
Donald Davis was the producer, Frank Heller was the director, and Alvin Sapinsley was the writer. The show originated from WCBS-TV.

Preservation status
Three episodes are in the collection of the Paley Center for Media.

See also
1949-50 United States network television schedule

References

Bibliography
Alex McNeil, Total Television, Fourth edition (New York: Penguin Books, 1980) 
Tim Brooks and Earle Marsh, The Complete Directory to Prime Time Network TV Shows, Third edition (New York: Ballantine Books, 1964)

External links
The Front Page (TV series) at IMDB

CBS original programming
1949 American television series debuts
1950 American television series endings
Black-and-white American television shows
English-language television shows
Television series about journalism